Nen language may refer to:
Nen language (Cameroon) or Tunen or Banen, a Southern Bantoid language
Nen language (Papuan) or Nen Zi, a Trans-Fly–Bulaka River language

See also
Nen (disambiguation)